The Zelenchuksky Churches or, Lower-Arkhyz Churches are located in an archaeological preserve extending for four kilometers around the ruins of Nizhnearkhyzskoe gorodishche near Arkhyz, Karachay–Cherkessia, Russian Federation. The site is tentatively identified as the medieval capital of Alania, a Christian state destroyed by the hordes of Möngke Khan in the 13th century.

History 
  
No Byzantine document mentions the name of this city, whereas al-Mas'udi refers to it as Ma'as, or Maghas. The most remarkable feature of the site is a cluster of three early medieval churches, whose construction is associated with the missionary activities of Patriarch Nicholas Mystikos in the Northern Caucasus. These structures bear much resemblance to the Shoana Church and Senty Church, situated in the neighbouring valleys. In the 19th century the churches were affiliated with the monastery of St. Alexander Nevsky. A monastic community was revived there after the fall of the Soviet Union.

The North Church is supposed to have been the cathedral of the diocese of Alania between the 10th and 13th centuries. The dome rises to a height of 21 meters; the western wall is twice as long. The narthex formerly contained a baptistery. A 19th-century traveller described the faded Byzantine frescoes that were still visible on its walls.

The Central Church appears to have been conceived somewhat earlier than the two others, in the form of a regular cross, but was extended to the west during or shortly following the construction. It is much larger than the South Church, which was built of coarse rubble masonry, extensively restored by the monks in 1899, fell into disuse during the Soviet years, and was reconsecrated to St. Elijah in 1991. The South Church bears the distinction of being the oldest functioning church in all of Russia.

Within 30 km from Nizhny Arkhyz a short grave inscription was discovered in 1888. Although it is written in Greek characters, the inscription (alternatively dated to 941 or 963) was interpreted by Vasily Abayev as the earliest preserved text in the Ossetic language. Another tourist attraction in the valley is a mandylion-type rock painting of Christ, datable to the 10th century but discovered only recently.

See also 
South Zelenchuksky Church
Central Zelenchuksky Church

Notes

References 

 Kuznetsov V.A. V Verkhovyakh Bolshogo Zelenchuka. Moscow: Iskusstvo, 1977.
 Zelenchuk churches: History and Views

10th-century churches in Russia
Populated places established in 1923
History of Karachay-Cherkessia
Churches in Karachay-Cherkessia
Medieval Eastern Orthodox church buildings in Russia